Brokesby  may refer to:

Francis Brokesby
Thomas Brokesby
William Brokesby (d.1416), Marshal of the Kings Hall, MP & Sheriff of Leicestershire
Brooksby, Leicestershire